The 1984 IAAF World Women's Road Race Championships was the second edition of the annual international road running competition organised by the International Amateur Athletics Federation (IAAF). The competition was hosted by Spain on 11 November 1984 in Madrid and featured one race only: a 10K run for women. There were individual and team awards available, with the national team rankings being decided by the combined times of a team's three best athletes (the only time this ranking system was used at the competition, as opposed to combined finishing positions). Countries with fewer than three finishers were not ranked.

The race was won by Aurora Cunha of Portugal in a time of 33:04. She was followed shortly after by her teammate Rosa Mota, while Great Britain's Carole Bradford took third place. Bradford led the British women's team to the team title, with Deborah-Ann Peel in fourth and Carol Greenwood in seventh to provide a combined winning time of 1:41:24 hours. Just over a minute behind on time was Portugal (Conceição Ferreira in 29th being the third runner) and the United States team led by ninth-placed Gail Kingma rounded out the team podium.

Results

Individual

Team

References

1984
IAAF World Women's Road Race Championships
IAAF World Women's Road Race Championships
IAAF World Women's Road Race Championships
IAAF World Women's Road Race Championships, 1984
IAAF World Women's Road Race Championships
Sports competitions in Madrid
International athletics competitions hosted by Spain